The Barbados national football team, nicknamed Bajan Tridents, is the national association football team of Barbados and is controlled by the Barbados Football Association. It has never qualified for a major international tournament. It came close to qualifying for the 2005 CONCACAF Gold Cup as it hosted the Caribbean Cup finals that acted as Gold Cup qualifiers, but finished fourth of the four teams. In 2001, it surprised many by making the semi-final round of the 2002 World Cup Qualifiers. In the first game of this round, they pulled off a shock 2–1 win over Costa Rica, but lost their five remaining games. In 2004, Barbados gained a shock 1–1 draw at home to Northern Ireland.

History

Beginnings (1929–1980)
Barbados played their first international match on April 20, 1929, against Trinidad and Tobago,  ending in a 3–0 victory. In the 1930s, they participated in several editions of the Martínez Shield where they suffered their most severe defeat against Guyana (at that time, British Guiana), in Georgetown, in 1931, 9–0.

Barbados had to wait for the qualifying tournament for the 1972 Munich Olympic Games to play its first official competition match against the amateur team of El Salvador, on July 25, 1971, in Bridgetown, a match that saw the Selecta win 0–3. Two years later, Barbados participated in the 1974 Central American and Caribbean Games, in Santo Domingo, although it did not qualify past the first round. On August 15, 1976, Barbados defeated Trinidad and Tobago 2–1 (a brace by Victor Clarke) in the 1978 World Cup qualifiers, which doubled as qualification for the 1977 CONCACAF Championship. In the second leg, the Soca Warriors claimed their revenge (1–0) in Port of Spain, taking the tie to a third tiebreaker game, played in Bridgetown, on September 14, 1976, where Trinidad and Tobago won 1–3 eliminating Barbados.

1980–2000
In the '80s, the Bajan Braves obtained 2nd place in the 1985 CFU Championship. The following year they played the 1986 Central American and Caribbean Games, where they reached the quarterfinals, before being eliminated by the hosts, Dominican Republic. At the end of the decade, Barbados hosted the first edition of the Caribbean Cup, without being able to progress beyond the group stage.

In the 90s, Barbados would return to the World Cup qualifiers, in the preliminary tournament for the 1994 World Cup, where it was again eliminated by Trinidad and Tobago (5–1). In the 1998 World Cup qualifiers, after beating Dominica with an aggregate score of 2–0, Barbados was beaten down by Jamaica (0–1 in Bridgetown and 2–0 in Kingston). In the Caribbean Cup, the Bajan Braves qualified for the 1994 competition (eliminated in the first round) but subsequently failed to qualify for the annual competition from 1995–1999.

2000s
The 21st century started well for Barbados, who eliminated Cuba on penalties (5–4), after two 1–1 draws in Havana and Bridgetown, during the qualifying rounds for the 2002 World Cup. In the second round, they achieved a historic victory at home against Costa Rica (2–1), on July 16, 2000, with goals from Llewellyn Riley and Michael Forde. However after winning that match, the Barbadians lost the remaining fixtures, wasting their chance to advance to the final hexagonal.

They would return in 2001 to the final phase of the Caribbean Cup, although without much luck after being eliminated again in the first round. In the 2006 World Cup qualifiers, the Saint Kitts and Nevis team eliminated Barbados in the first phase, with an aggregate score of 5–2. In 2005, Barbados hosted (for the second time) the XII edition of the Caribbean Cup, finishing in 4th place. They also qualified for the 2007 and 2008 tournaments, eliminated both times in the group stage. In the preliminary tournament for the 2010 World Cup, Barbados was eliminated by the United States, over two legs, with a crushing aggregate result of 9–0.

2010–present
The qualifiers heading to the 2014 World Cup were a real ordeal for the Bajan Braves who were placed into a group with Bermuda, Guyana and Trinidad and Tobago. They finished last in the group, with 2 goals scored and 14 conceded. After being eliminated in the preliminary phase of the Caribbean Cup in 2012 and after 17 months of inactivity, Barbados returned to play an international match, on March 2, 2014, against Jamaica, in Bridgetown, a match that concluded with victory for the Reggae Boyz, 2–0.

In the qualifying rounds for the 2018 World Cup, they would face the US Virgin Islands where they were surprised 0–1 at home, however, Barbados would overcome the deficit by a 0–4 victory on the road. Then they would face Aruba, winning 0–2 as a visitor, then beating them 1–0 at home however Barbados had fielded an ineligible player, Hadan Holligan, who was due to serve a suspension for collecting two yellow cards, therefore the second leg was awarded to Aruba 3–0, seeing them progress, eliminating Barbados.

Results and fixtures

The following is a list of match results in the last 12 months, as well as any future matches that have been scheduled.

2022

2023

Coaching history

  Daniel Reid
  Tom Burke
  Jordan Emmett
  Ryan Kontoh
  Kevin Millard (1992)
  Keith Griffith (1994)
  Edward Smith (1996)
  Eyre Sealy (1998)
  Horace Beckles (2000)
  Sherlock Yarde (2001)
  Keith Griffith (2002)
  Allison John (2003)
  Kenville Layne (2003–04)
  Mark Doherty (2005)
  Eyre Sealy (2007–08)
  Keith Griffith (2008)
  Thomas Jordan (2008–10)
  Colin Forde (2011–14)
  Marcos Falopa (2014–15)
  Colin Harewood (2015–17)
  Ahmed Mohamed Ahmed (2017–2019)
  Russell Latapy (2019–2022)
  Orlando da Costa (2022-)

Players

Current squad
The following players were called up for the friendly matches against Grenada on 20, 24 and 26 February 2023.

Caps and goals correct as of: 13 June 2022, after the match against Guadeloupe

Recent call-ups
The following players have been called up within the past 12 months.

Player records

Players in bold are still active with Barbados.

Competitive record

FIFA World Cup

CONCACAF Gold Cup

CONCACAF Nations League

CFU Caribbean Cup

Head-to-head record
These all-time records are exclusively class 'A' internationals matches.

Key

See also
Barbados men's national under-17 football team
Football in Barbados
Barbados 4–2 Grenada (1994 Caribbean Cup qualification)
Sport in Barbados

References

External links

 
Barbados team profile, FIFA website

 
Caribbean national association football teams
Football in Barbados